Gallows Run is a tributary of Elk Run in Sullivan County, Pennsylvania, in the United States. The stream meets the standards of the Pennsylvania Department of Environmental Protection. Wisconsinan Till, Wisconsinan Bouldery Till, and bedrock consisting of sandstone and shale occur in the vicinity of the stream. There is also a patch of wetland in the area.

Course
Gallows Run begins at the top of a valley in Davidson Township. It flows southeast for a short distance. The stream then turns east-southeast for a few tenths of a mile, steeply descending in its valley. At the end of the valley, it reaches its confluence with Elk Run.

Hydrology
Gallows Run attains the stream standards of the Pennsylvania Department of Environmental Protection. It is designated by the Pennsylvania Department of Environmental Protection for use for aquatic life.

Geography and geology

For most of its length, Gallows Run flows over bedrock consisting of shale and sandstone. However, Wisconsinan Bouldery Till occurs near the stream's mouth. Wisconsinan Bouldery Till is a glacial or resedimented till that contains numerous boulders consisting of sandstone, quartz, and conglomerate. Another glacial or resedimented till, Wisconsinan Till, occurs in the upper reaches of the watershed.

Watershed
The stream is entirely within the United States Geological Survey quadrangle of Elk Grove.

There is an patch of wetland near the headwaters of Gallows Run.

The streambed of Gallows Run is publicly owned. It is one of only twenty such streams in the Upper Susquehanna-Lackawanna drainage basin. Two of the other three (Hog Run and Long Run) are also tributaries of Elk Run. Additionally, the streambed of Elk Run itself is publicly owned.

History
Gallows Run was entered into the Geographic Names Information System on August 2, 1979. Its identifier in the Geographic Names Information System is 1175399.

See also
Hog Run, next tributary of Elk Run going downstream
List of tributaries of Fishing Creek (North Branch Susquehanna River)

References

Rivers of Sullivan County, Pennsylvania
Tributaries of Fishing Creek (North Branch Susquehanna River)
Rivers of Pennsylvania